Christopher John Worthy (October 23, 1947 – August 2, 2007) was a British-born Canadian ice hockey player who played 81 games in the World Hockey Association and 26 games in the National Hockey League between 1968 and 1976 with the Edmonton Oilers and California Golden Seals.

Christopher John Worthy was born in Bristol, England, United Kingdom, but grew up in Ontario, Canada. He attended college at Harvard University. He died of pancreatic cancer at his home in Vancouver, British Columbia, Canada, at age 59, survived by Lesley, his wife of 41 years, and two sons.

Career statistics

Regular season and playoffs

Awards and achievements
MJHL First All-Star Team (1967)
MJHL Top Goaltender Award (1967)
Turnbull Cup MJHL Championship (1967)
 WCJHL First All-Star Team (1968)

See also
List of National Hockey League players from the United Kingdom

External links
 

1947 births
2007 deaths
California Golden Seals players
Canadian ice hockey goaltenders
Denver Spurs (WHL) players
Edmonton Oilers (WHA) players
Flin Flon Bombers players
Ice hockey people from Ontario
Kansas City Blues players
Oakland Seals players
Providence Reds players
Seattle Totems (WHL) players